Zhuhai North (Zhuhaibei) railway station, is an elevated station on the Guangzhou–Zhuhai intercity railway. It is in the Zhuhai National Hi-Tech Industrial Development District in Xiangzhou District, Zhuhai, Guangdong Province, China.

The station started operations on 7January 2011. From its opening until 31December 2012, it was the only station open in Zhuhai and served as the temporary south terminus of the Guangzhu ICR until the remaining stations in Zhuhai opened; the line was extended to the permanent southern terminus at the Zhuhai railway station in downtown Zhuhai.

Station layout

References

Railway stations in Guangdong
Zhuhai
Railway stations in China opened in 2011